Los Alamos Science was the Los Alamos National Laboratory's flagship publication in the years 1980 to 2005. Its main purpose was to present the laboratory's research and its significance to national security to the scientific community, and US government policymakers.

Special issues appeared on subjects such as particle physics, Stanislaw Ulam, and the Human Genome Project.
"Pedagogical articles" were intended to explain difficult concepts in one field to scientists and students in other fields.

References

Science and technology magazines published in the United States
Magazines established in 1980
Magazines disestablished in 2005
Defunct magazines published in the United States
Biannual magazines published in the United States
Magazines published in New Mexico
Physics magazines